This is list of airports ValuJet Airlines flew to during the 1990s until its demise.

Canada

Montréal, QC - Montréal-Dorval International Airport

United States

Atlanta, GA - Hartsfield–Jackson Atlanta International Airport
Akron/Canton, OH - Akron-Canton Airport
Boston, MA - Boston Logan International Airport
Charlotte, NC - Charlotte Douglas International Airport
Chicago, IL - Chicago Midway International Airport
Columbus, OH - John Glenn Columbus International Airport
Dallas/Fort Worth, TX - Dallas/Fort Worth International Airport
Detroit, MI - Detroit Metropolitan Wayne County Airport
Flint, MI - Bishop International Airport
Fort Lauderdale, FL - Fort Lauderdale–Hollywood International Airport
Fort Myers, FL - Southwest Florida International Airport
Fort Walton Beach, FL - Northwest Florida Regional Airport
Hartford, CT - Bradley International Airport
Houston, TX - William P. Hobby Airport
Indianapolis, IN - Indianapolis International Airport
Jacksonville, FL - Jacksonville International Airport
Kansas City - Kansas City International Airport
Louisville, KY - Louisville Muhammad Ali International Airport
Memphis, TN - Memphis International Airport
Miami, FL - Miami International Airport
Mobile, AL - Mobile Regional Airport
Nashville, TN - Nashville International Airport
New Orleans, LA - Louis Armstrong New Orleans International Airport
Newport News, VA - Newport News/Williamsburg International Airport
Orlando, FL - Orlando International Airport
Philadelphia, PA - Philadelphia International Airport
Pittsburgh, PA - Pittsburgh International Airport
Raleigh/Durham, NC - Raleigh-Durham International Airport
Savannah, GA - Savannah/Hilton Head International Airport
Tampa, FL - Tampa International Airport
Washington D.C. - Washington Dulles International Airport
West Palm Beach, FL - Palm Beach International Airport

References 

Valuejet